The 2003 NCAA Rifle Championships were contested at the 24th annual NCAA-sanctioned competition to determine the team and individual national champions of co-ed collegiate rifle shooting in the United States. This year's championships were held at the United States Military Academy in West Point, New York. 

Four-time defending champions Alaska once again topped the team standings, finishing 90 points (6,287–6,197) ahead of Xavier. This was the Nanooks' fifth consecutive and sixth overall team title.

Matthew Emmons (Alaska) once again repeated as the individual national champion for the smallbore rifle (his third consecutive in air rifle and fourth individual title overall, all since 2001). Emmons remains the only collegiate shooter with four NCAA individual titles. The air rifle title was claimed by Jamie Beyerle (Alaska).

Qualification
With only one national collegiate championship for rifle shooting, all NCAA rifle programs (whether from Division I, Division II, or Division III) were eligible. A total of ten teams contested this championship, a return to the size of the original two championships in 1980 and 1981.

Results
Scoring:  The championship consisted of 120 shots by each competitor in smallbore and 40 shots per competitor in air rifle.

Team title
(H) = Hosts
(DC) = Defending champions
Italics = Inaugural championship

Individual events

References

NCAA Rifle Championship
NCAA Rifle Championships
2003 in shooting sports
NCAA Rifle Championships